The 1906 Kansas Jayhawks football team was an American football team that represented the University of Kansas as an independent during the 1906 college football season. In their third season under head coach A. R. Kennedy, the Jayhawks compiled a 7–2–2 record and outscored opponents by a total of 148 to 55. The Jayhawks played their home games at McCook Field in Lawrence, Kansas. Prentiss Donald was the team captain.

Schedule

References

Kansas
Kansas Jayhawks football seasons
Kansas Jayhawks football